Andrew Brown may refer to:

Arts
Andrew Brown (CNN journalist), British-born journalist in Hong Kong
Andrew Brown (writer) (born 1955), British writer and journalist
Andrew Brown (Philadelphia Gazette) ( 1744–?), Irish soldier, journalist and congressional reporter
Andrew Brown (author), South African crime novelist
Andrew Brown (musician) (1900–1960), American jazz saxophonist

Sports
Andrew Brown (cricketer, born 1964), English cricketer
Andrew Brown (cricketer, born 1935) (1935–2020), former Scottish cricketer and Royal Navy sailor
Andrew Brown (outfielder) (born 1984), American baseball outfielder
Andrew Brown (pitcher) (born 1981), American baseball pitcher
Andrew Brown (rugby league) (born 1981), rugby league footballer for Scotland and Fife Lions
Andrew Brown (rugby union, born 20 April 1980), Welsh rugby union footballer
Andrew Brown (rugby union, born 10 April 1980), Australian rugby union footballer
Andrew Brown (soccer) (1870–1948), Scottish soccer coach
Andrew Brown (footballer) ( 1860– 1930), Scottish footballer
Andrew Brown (American football) (born 1995), American football defensive tackle
Andrew Brown (sailor) (born 1977), New Zealand sailor

Others
Andrew Brown (minister) (1763–1834), Professor of Rhetoric, historian of Nova Scotia
Andrew Brown (media strategist) (born 1955), Scottish media strategist, former journalist and broadcaster
Andrew Brown (industrialist), industrialist and philanthropist, first European settler of the Lithgow Valley, New South Wales, Australia
Andrew Phillip Brown (born 1951), Australian botanist and taxonomist
Andrew Gibson Brown (born 1945), HM Chief Inspector of Constabulary for Scotland, 2004–2007
Andrew Betts Brown (1841–1906), Scottish engineer and inventor

See also
Andie Brown (born 1955), Anglican Archdeacon of Man (the Isle of Man)
Andrew Browne (disambiguation)
Andy Brown (disambiguation)
Drew Bundini Brown (1928–1987), assistant trainer and cornerman of boxer Muhammad Ali
Killing of Andrew Brown Jr.